Nurabad (also Romanized as Nūrābād) is a village in Astaneh Rural District, in the Central District of Shazand County, Markazi Province, Iran. At the 2006 census, its population was 438, in 116 families.

References 

Populated places in Shazand County